Daouda Peeters (born 26 January 1999) is a Belgian professional footballer who plays as a midfielder for  club Juventus.

Born in Guinea, Peeters holds Belgian citizenship and has represented Belgium internationally at youth level since 2015.

Club career

Juventus
Peeters made his Serie A debut, as well as his senior Juventus debut, in a 2–0 away defeat to Cagliari on 29 July 2020. He also became the first Belgian player to play for Juventus.

Loan to Standard Liège
On 19 August 2021, Peeters was loaned to Belgian side Standard Liège. On 4 November, he was diagnosed a neuropathy.

Career statistics

Club

Honours 
Juventus U23
 Coppa Italia Serie C: 2019–20

Juventus
 Serie A: 2019–20

References

External links 
 
 

1999 births
Living people
People from Boké Region
Guinean emigrants to Belgium
Naturalised citizens of Belgium
Belgian footballers
Belgian people of Guinean descent
Association football midfielders
Lierse S.K. players
Club Brugge KV players
U.C. Sampdoria players
Juventus Next Gen players
Juventus F.C. players
Standard Liège players
Serie C players
Serie A players
Belgian Pro League players
Belgium youth international footballers
Belgian expatriate footballers
Belgian expatriate sportspeople in Italy
Expatriate footballers in Italy